Lori Roach (born 1970) is a Bahamian road racing cyclist.

In 2019, she placed second in the Bahamas National Championship Women's time trial  and also participated in the aquabike competition in the 2019 Caribbean Age Group Triathlon.

References

1970 births
Living people
Bahamian female cyclists